KAMO-FM (94.3 MHz) is a radio station broadcasting a country music format. Licensed to Rogers, Arkansas, United States, it serves the Fayetteville (North West Arkansas) area. The station is owned by Cumulus Media. KAMO was once owned by Leon McAuliff who played steel guitar for Bob Wills, leader of the Texas Playboys.

References

External links

Country radio stations in the United States
AMO-FM
Radio stations established in 1973
1973 establishments in Arkansas
Cumulus Media radio stations